Schersing is a surname. Notable people with the surname include:

 Mathias Schersing (born 1964), German sprinter
 Petra Schersing (born 1965), German sprinter